Santesson is a Swedish surname. People of interest called Santesson are 

 Hans Stefan Santesson (1914—1975) American writer and editor of science fiction and fantasy literature
 Anton Santesson (b. 1994) Swedish ice hockey player
 Awa Santesson-Sey (b. 1997) Swedish singer
 Nils Santesson (1873—1960) Swedish sculptor, writer and pewterer